The year 597 BC was a year of the pre-Julian Roman calendar. In the Roman Empire, it was known as year 157 Ab urbe condita. The denomination 597 BC for this year has been used since the early medieval period, when the Anno Domini calendar era became the prevalent method in Europe for naming years.

Events
 March 16 – Several months' Siege of Jerusalem ends with Nebuchadnezzar capturing and plundering the city and Temple in Jerusalem. He sends into Babylonian captivity the new young king Jeconiah (replacing him with Zedekiah, a puppet ruler) and number of other prominent Jews, including Ezekiel, along with a sizable portion of the Jewish population of the Kingdom of Judah, numbering about 10,000. The Ark of the Covenant vanishes at this time.
Battle of Bi. Jin and Chu fought in the battle of Bi. Viscount Huan of Zhongxing led the Jin army and was defeated by King Zhuang of Chu.

Births

Deaths

References